Luiz Eduardo Figueiredo commonly known as Dudu Figueiredo (born 12 May 1991) is a Brazilian footballer who plays as an attacking midfielder.

Career
Dudu began playing football in Coritiba's youth system. After a loan to Chapecoense, Dudu returned to play for Coritiba's senior side in September 2013.

References

External links

1991 births
Living people
Association football midfielders
Brazilian footballers
Campeonato Brasileiro Série A players
Coritiba Foot Ball Club players
Oeste Futebol Clube players
Rio Branco Sport Club players
Associação Chapecoense de Futebol players
Criciúma Esporte Clube players
Fluminense FC players
Ohod Club players
Al-Tai FC players
Dibba FC players
Al-Orobah FC players
Expatriate footballers in Saudi Arabia
Brazilian expatriate sportspeople in Saudi Arabia
Expatriate footballers in the United Arab Emirates
Brazilian expatriate sportspeople in the United Arab Emirates
Saudi Professional League players
Saudi First Division League players
UAE First Division League players
Footballers from Curitiba